Matt Clark is a fictional character from the American CBS soap opera The Young and the Restless. The role was originated by Eddie Cibrian in May 1994, who left the show in 1996. After Russell Lawrence briefly playing the character in 2000, Rick Hearst took over the role that year, departing in 2001 after the character was killed off. Hearst returned for several appearances as an apparition. Matt was known as an antagonistic villain who created problems for Nick and Sharon Newman, beginning when they were teens in high school. He raped both Sharon Collins and Amy Wilson, and framed Nicholas Newman for multiple crimes.

Casting and characterization

Eddie Cibrian was hired to portray recurring character Matt Clark in May 1994. In October of that year, he signed a three-year contract with the series. Cibrian said that he believed the writers "were going to turn the story into something bigger" and wanted to keep it going. The character exited in 1996 after nearly three years. Russell Lawrence became the next actor in the role, portraying Matt in 2000. However, he was replaced a few months later with Rick Hearst who debuted in October 2000. Hearst was familiar with the soap opera genre, having played Alan-Michael Spaulding on Guiding Light for several years prior. TimesDaily wrote: "Expect the storyline of the vengeful Matt to be stepped up with Hearst in the role".

In April 2001, it was announced that Hearst would exit, and the character died onscreen the following month. However, due to Hearst's popularity with viewers, the actor returned for several recurring guest appearances beginning July 2001 as a vision being seen by the insane Tricia Dennison after his character's death. Speaking on his exit and appearances afterward, Hearst said: "I look at every opportunity as a gift. When I was let go (...) and was brought back as a freaking apparition for six months, I looked at it as, they called me for work this week."

Matt has been characterized by Soaps In Depth as the show's previous "bad boy", and a "cocky jock-turned rapist" by Star-News. Cibrian called him "horrific", stating: "I've never encountered anybody like him in my life. Nor would I ever want to." The character started out as a "regular guy" on the show, but after Cibrian became a regular cast member, he began doing "awful things" and became "the bad guy", beginning with raping Sharon Collins (Sharon Case). Cibrian found the role challenging and said: "Unfortunately there are people in the world like Matt. That’s why they put this in the script, so people could be aware."

Storylines
As a high school senior in 1994, Matt Clark dates Sharon Collins and develops a bitter rivalry with Nicholas Newman (Joshua Morrow) who ends up winning Sharon from him. A fight between Matt and Nick results in Nick being badly beaten. Shortly thereafter, Matt rapes Sharon, causing her to sink into a depression. Matt then dates Amy Wilson (Julianne Morris), Sharon's best friend. Reacting to Nick and Sharon becoming king and queen of their high school Polynesian dance, Matt exposes Sharon's secret: that she is not a virgin, and had given up a baby for adoption when she was 16. While Nick is briefly angry at Sharon, he forgives her and the pair become engaged. After Sharon confesses to Nick that Matt raped her, just prior to their planned wedding, Nick goes after Matt, but instead finds him lying in a pool of blood on his apartment floor, having been shot. Nick is arrested, while Matt survives and falsely claims that Nick shot him. After a trial, Nick is found guilty and sentenced to 15 years in prison. Nick's father Victor Newman (Eric Braeden) tracks down Amy in a mental institution, who has been suffering from PTSD. Amy reveals that she was the person who shot Matt after he raped her. Nick is acquitted and Matt leaves town in 1996.

In 2000, Matt Clark resurfaces in town under the alias of Carter Mills, having had plastic surgery to change his appearance, and begins working at Nick and Sharon's coffeehouse. Carter uses Tricia Dennison (Sabryn Genet), a woman he slept with, to frame Nick for selling drugs. Sharon grows close with Carter while Nick is in jail. Carter nearly succeeds in raping Sharon by using a date rape drug, but Nick arrives home and his plans are thwarted. Paul Williams (Doug Davidson) begins searching for Matt Clark, realizing that he may have had plastic surgery. Carter later meets Sharon at a cabin in the woods and tries to rape her there, but is stopped when Victor arrives. Tricia drives off with Carter in her car but deliberately drives off a cliff in an attempt to kill them both. While Tricia survives the crash, Carter had fatal injuries. Carter pulls out his own breathing tube, killing himself, and framing Nick for his murder. Nick is implicated in Carter's murder, but is ultimately found not guilty.

Just before Matt's death, he lied to Nick, telling him that he had raped Sharon. Sharon becomes pregnant, and Nick demands a paternity test, which she refuses (not wanting to harm the child). After a fight with Nick, Sharon runs after him and trips over a chair. The fall causes her to give birth prematurely to a stillborn baby. A paternity test confirmed that Nick was the father, not Matt.

Reception
Both Cibrian and Hearst became popular for their portrayals of Matt. In 1996, soap opera journalist Seli Groves of The Beaver County Times newspaper opined that it was likely for Matt to return one day, writing that "characters with this sort of seething history are often recalled from soap limbo". A message published in the newspaper by a viewer named Andrea P. described the character of Matt as "a real rat", but with the observation that Cibrian "played it so well". When Lawrence was cast in the role, Toby Goldstein of TimesDaily noted that Matt was "likely to bring misery to Nick and Sharon's lives". Global TV's Aaron Hagey-MacKay included the character's death on a list of the "Top drunken, brutal, mysterious and volcanic deaths of Y&R". Entertainment Weekly called Matt an "evil rapist", while Sara Bibel of Xfinity argued in 2009 that the character was written out due to being a rapist, stating that the soap opera was "the one show with a zero tolerance for sexual assault".

References
6

External links
Matt Clark at soapcentral.com

Clark, Matt
Clark, Matt
Clark, Matt
Clark, Matt